Eiguliai ('forest rangers', formerly) is a village in Kėdainiai district municipality, in Kaunas County, in central Lithuania. According to the 2011 census, the village was uninhabited. It is located between Kėdainiai and Paobelys, by the Obelis river.

History

In the end of the 19th century there was Eiguliai railway station by the Libau–Romny Railway, also Eiguliai folwark (a property of the Geištarai till 1863). Eiguliai village was a church property. In the 1970s almost entire Eiguliai village have been merged to Kėdainiai (now Pramonė Street).

Demography

References

Villages in Kaunas County
Kėdainiai District Municipality